Five Houses  is a rural community in the Canadian province of Nova Scotia, located in Colchester County.

References

Communities in Colchester County
General Service Areas in Nova Scotia